Polycheles is a genus of decapods within the family Polychelidae, with 9 current species assigned to it. Members of this genus are found in oceans worldwide at depths of 665 to 938 meters.

Species 

 Polycheles amemiyai 
 Polycheles baccatus 
 Polycheles coccifer 
 Polycheles enthrix 
 Polycheles kermadecensis 
 Polycheles martini 
 Polycheles perarmatus 
 Polycheles tanneri 
 Polycheles typhlops

References 

Polychelida
Decapod genera